The Oakley-Lindsay Center is the regional convention center for Quincy, Illinois and the tri-state region. It opened in 1995 at a cost of $8 million. It serves as the convention hub of the Quincy micropolitan area and fills the market in-between St. Louis and Iowa City.

The center served as a sandbagging focal point during the Flood of 2008 with over 1 million sandbags filled. The Oakley-Lindsay Center and the sandbagging effort was featured on many news organizations and even had a visit from then-presidential candidate Barack Obama (D-IL) on Saturday, June 14.

Location
The convention center is located just south of downtown Quincy along Gardner Expressway (Illinois Route 57) and is 3 blocks from the Mississippi River. Many of Quincy's historic landmarks lie within walking distance of the facility including the Villa Kathrine, many hotels, downtown, and many parks lining the river.

Facilities

McClain-Kent Hall 

The hall's capacity is 3,500 people and it houses concerts, plus many other larger events of the tri-states, such as the annual WGEM Home & Living Show.

Oakley and Lindsay Rooms 

The Oakley and Lindsay Rooms are rooms that house small groups of people. They are designed for seminars, workshops, and conferences.

Quincy Community Theater 

Oakley-Lindsay Center also houses the Quincy Community Theater, which is a 500-seat state-of-the-art theater that puts on many shows throughout the year.

Events 
Popular events at the OLC have included receptions, proms, boxing events, rodeo, and also concerts.

Concert Portfolio 
 Destiny's Child - 2000
 Diamond Rio - December 7, 2002
 Skillet  October 25, 2011

Other Notable Events 
 President Barack Obama's "White House to Main Street" Tour  April 28, 2010

See also
 List of convention centers in the United States

References

External links 
 
 Quincy Herald-Whiq article on the center's 10th Anniversary

Quincy–Hannibal area
Boxing venues in Illinois
Convention centers in Illinois
Music venues in Illinois
Buildings and structures in Quincy, Illinois
Sports in Quincy, Illinois
Tourist attractions in Quincy, Illinois